HMS Laverock was a  destroyer of the Royal Navy. She was launched in 1913 and entered service in October 1914. Laverock served through the First World War, operating with the Harwich Force and in the English Channel. She was sold for scrap in 1921.

Construction and design
The British Admiralty ordered 20 L-class (later to become the ) destroyers as part of the 1912–1913 shipbuilding programme for the Royal Navy. An initial order for 16 destroyers was placed on 29 March 1912, with four more ordered from Yarrow & Company (to become  and Laverock) and two from Beardmore ( and ) later in the year.

The ship was laid down at Yarrow's Scotstoun, Glasgow shipyard on 24 July 1912 as Hereward but on 30 September 1913, the Admiralty ordered that the L-class be renamed with names beginning with the letter "L", and Hereward was renamed Laverock. Laverock  was launched on 19 November 1913. The ship was undergoing final acceptance trials on 1 March 1914 when she ran aground in the Firth of Clyde near Skelmorlie, suffering a  gash on her port side, and was not refloated until 29 March. She was completed in October 1914.

Three Yarrow boilers fed steam to direct-drive Parsons steam turbines which drove two propeller shafts. Two funnels were fitted. The ship's main gun armament consisted of three QF  Mk IV guns on the ship's centreline, with 120 rounds per gun, supplemented by a .303 in (7.7 mm) Maxim machine gun. The ship carried two twin 21 inch (533 mm) torpedo tubes, and was fitted with rails to carry four Vickers Elia Mk IV naval mines, although these rails were never used. A single QF 2-pounder pom-pom Mk. II gun was fitted from 1916. The ship had a complement of 73 officers and men.

Service
On commissioning Laverock joined the 3rd Destroyer Flotilla, part of the Harwich Force, which was under the overall command of Commodore Reginald Tyrwhitt. As their course took them between British and German minefields, the ships encountered many stray floating mines, destroying 15 of them. The patrol was still at sea when German cruisers and battlecruisers carried out a raid on Yarmouth the next morning, and was ordered to Yarmouth to attempt to intercept the German force. The Germans, however, managed to escape the British forces. In October 1915 the 3rd Destroyer Flotilla was renumbered the 9th Destroyer Flotilla, still remaining part of the Harwich Force, with Laverock remaining part of the new formation.

Laverock was part of the escort for the seaplane carrier  when Vindex, covered by most of the Harwich Force, launched an unsuccessful air attack against a German Zeppelin base believed to be at Hoyer in Schleswig-Holstein on 25–26 March 1916. Only two out of five seaplanes dispatched returned, reporting that the Zeppelin base was in fact at Tondern, but that they were unable to attack the base. Tyrwhitt sent several of his destroyers, including Laverock to search for the missing seaplanes. No sign of the missing seaplanes were found (they had, in fact, ditched due to engine trouble, and their crews captured by the Germans) but the force did encounter two German patrol boats which they sank. When picking up survivors from the two patrol boats, Laverock rammed the destroyer . While damage to Laverock was confined to her bows, Medusa had been holed in her engine room and was taken in tow by the Flotilla leader , but due to the severe weather, Medusa eventually had to be scuttled. During the return journey of Tyrwhitt's force, the cruisers  and  also collided, badly damaging Undaunted, shortly after Cleopatra rammed and sunk the German destroyer .

The Harwich Force was held back as a reserve during the Battle of Jutland on 31 May–1 June 1916, but when the battleship  was damaged by a German torpedo, Laverock was one of eight destroyers of the Harwich Force sent to escort the crippled battleship to the Humber. Believing that Lassoo had been torpedoed, the other destroyers deployed their anti-submarine explosive sweeps. Laverocks sweep detonated, but no debris came up.

Early in 1917, the 9th Destroyer Flotilla was split up, with the newer destroyers joining the 10th Destroyer Flotilla, and the L-class ships being dispersed to different units, with Laverock joining the Dover Patrol. On the night of 24/25 February 1917, Laverock was one of five destroyers (the others were Lance,  and ) patrolling the Dover Straits to guard against attack by German torpedo boats, while further forces of destroyers and cruisers were on standby in the Downs and at Dover. That night, German torpedo boats a raid against the Dover Barrage and Allied shipping in the Dover Straits, with one flotilla attacking the Barrage and a half flotilla of torpedo boats operating off the Kent coast. The southern German force, the 6th Flotilla, comprising six torpedo boats (equivalent to Royal Navy destroyers) encountered Laverock and engaged the British destroyer with gunfire and at least two torpedoes, one of which struck Laverock but did not detonate. Laverock set out in pursuit of the German ships, which broke contact and returned to base, their commander believing that he was engaged with several destroyers and that his planned raid on Dover was no longer possible. The second German group of five torpedo boats, was spotted near the North entrance to the Downs, and shelled Margate and Westgate-on-Sea prior to returning to base.

On 18 April 1917, Laverock left the 6th Flotilla, joining the 4th Flotilla, now based at Devonport and employed on convoy escort duties. Laverock remained part of the 4th Flotilla at the end of the war on 11 November 1918.

Disposal
Laverock was laid up in reserve at the Nore by March 1919, and was sold for scrap to Thos. W. Ward's Grays shipbreaking yard on 9 May 1921.

Pennant Numbers

Notes

Citations

References
 
 
 
 
 
 
 
 
 
 
 
 
 

 

Laforey-class destroyers (1913)
1913 ships
World War I destroyers of the United Kingdom
Maritime incidents in February 1914
Maritime incidents in 1916